This is a list of museums in Belarus.

Belarusian Great Patriotic War Museum
Belarusian National Arts Museum
Belarusian National History and Culture Museum
Belarusian Nature and Environment Museum
Berestye Archeological Museum
Brest Railway Museum
Gomel Palace
Maksim Bahdanovič Literary Museum
Marc Chagall Museum
Old Belarusian History Museum
Tower of Kamyanyets
Virtual Museum of Soviet Repression in Belarus
Vitebsk Museum of Modern Art
Vitebsk regional museum

See also

 List of museums
 Culture of Belarus

External links
Belarusian National Arts Museum
National Historical Museum of the Republic of Belarus
Eastern Belarus: What To See And Do
Western Belarus: What To See And Do

Museums
 
Belarus
Museums
Museums
Belarus